Expect the Unexpected may refer to:

 an album by Mike Jones (rapper)
 Expect the Unexpected (film), a 1998 Hong Kong film directed by Patrick Yau  Tak Chi
 A quotation from Oscar Wilde's play An Ideal Husband: "To expect the unexpected shows a thoroughly modern intellect." 

 See South Carolina Football